John Edwards (1748–1837) was an American planter and statesman who played a key role in securing Kentucky statehood, and represented the new state in the United States Senate.

Edwards was born in Stafford County, Virginia, and moved to Fayette County to start a plantation in what is now Bourbon County, Kentucky, around 1780. He represented his county in the Virginia House of Delegates in several years and was part of the commission that determined the borders for Kentucky in 1788. In 1792 he was a delegate to the convention that drafted the first constitution for the new state, and when statehood was accomplished he and John Brown were the first U.S. senators for Kentucky.

After his term as a senator he served in both houses of the state legislature. He died on his plantation and was buried in the family graveyard near Paris, Kentucky.

His sons, Haden Edwards and Benjamin W. Edwards, were land speculators in Texas who led the failed Fredonian Rebellion against Mexican control.

External links

 

1748 births
1837 deaths
People from Stafford County, Virginia
Virginia colonial people
Anti-Administration Party United States senators from Kentucky
Members of the Virginia House of Delegates
Members of the Kentucky House of Representatives
Kentucky state senators
American planters